Sir Harry Benedetto Renwick, 1st Baronet, KBE (13 June 1861 – 7 January 1932) was a British businessman and public servant. An electricity industry executive, during the First World War he was the Director of Feeding Stuffs Department at the Ministry of Flood.

Renwick was created a KBE in 1920 "For services in connection with the War" and a Baronet, of Coombe in the County of Surrey, in 1927.

Renwick died in 1932. His son Robert succeeded to the baronetcy and was created Baron Renwick in 1964.

References 

 https://www.ukwhoswho.com/view/10.1093/ww/9780199540891.001.0001/ww-9780199540884-e-216081

1861 births
1932 deaths
Knights Commander of the Order of the British Empire
Baronets in the Baronetage of the United Kingdom
Civil servants in the Ministry of Food
20th-century British businesspeople
British energy industry businesspeople